Il Genio are an Italian electropop duo, consisting of Gianluca De Rubertis (guitar, keyboards, drums) and Alessandra Contini (bass vocals). Originally from Lecce, they moved to Milan in the early 2000s. In 2008 they were signed by Disastro Record (a label affiliated to Universal) and released their first album. Il Genio are best known for their hit Pop Porno, who spent seven weeks in the Italian top 20.

Discography

Albums 
 Il Genio (2008)
 Vivere Negli Anni X (2010)
 Una voce poco fa (2013)

Singles 
 Pop Porno (2008)
 Non è Possibile (2009)
 Cosa Dubiti (2010)
 Precipitevolissimevolmente (duet with Dente) (2010)
 Tahiti Tahiti (2010)
 Roberta (2010)
 Amore chiama Terra (2011)
 Amore di massa (2013)
 Bar cinesi (2013)
 Dopo Mezzanotte (2014)

Italian pop music groups
Pop music duos
Italian musical duos
Male–female musical duos
Musical groups from Milan